William Harrison Bledsoe (December 23, 1869 – March 30, 1936), was a Texas attorney who served in the Texas House of Representatives and the Texas Senate. During the latter service, he helped enact legislation creating Texas Tech University.

References

 

 

1869 births
1936 deaths
People from Cleburne, Texas
University of Texas at Austin alumni
Texas lawyers
Democratic Party members of the Texas House of Representatives
Democratic Party Texas state senators
School board members in Texas
City and town attorneys in the United States
Businesspeople from Texas
People from Lubbock, Texas
Burials in Texas